Ali Khaddafi (7 July 1984 – 19 October 2015) was a Togolese football midfielder who played professionally in Togo and Indonesia. He last played for Perseru Serui.

Honours 
AS Douanes
Winner
 Togolese Championnat National: 2004–05
 Coupe du Togo: 2004

Sriwijaya
Winner
 Indonesian Inter Island Cup: 2012

References

External links 
 
 

1984 births
2015 deaths
Sportspeople from Lomé
Togolese footballers
Togo international footballers
Expatriate footballers in Indonesia
Liga 1 (Indonesia) players
PSPS Pekanbaru players
PSM Makassar players
Bontang F.C. players
Association football midfielders
21st-century Togolese people
Togolese expatriate footballers